Sekolah Menengah Kebangsaan Taman Connaught (abbreviation: SMK Taman Connaught or SMKTC) is a Malaysian national secondary school in Kuala Lumpur, Malaysia. Currently, it has about 2,500 students and 100 teachers operating in two shifts, a morning session for Form 3, 4 and 5 students aged 15 to 18 years old, and an afternoon session for Remove, Form 1 and 2 students aged 13 to 15 years old.

History
When it was proposed that a new secondary school be built in Cheras in July 1987, Taman Connaught was identified as an ideal place to build the school. Under a RM2.5 million World Bank loan, construction began on 4 December 1989. Construction was completed on 27 November 1991.

During the construction period, the first cohort of Connaughtians consisting of thirteen teachers and 197 students started the first school session on 4 December 1989. Students and teachers temporarily used the adjacent primary school SJK(C) Taman Connaught until 1990. Five classrooms were used for administration, teaching, and learning purposes. Eventually, the students and teachers moved to the newly built school on 3 December 1990 although there was no power supply.

The newly completed school comprised two 3-storey buildings, one 2-storey building, six science labs, three life skills workshops, three home science rooms, a canteen, a surau, a staffroom, a car park, a field, and a library. There were 34 classrooms available for teaching and learning activities.

3 computer labs
In January 1998, the surau located on the ground floor of Block B was moved to the top floor of Block A while the computer room was moved to the second floor. Subsequently, the computer room was upgraded to a fully equipped computer lab in 2000 with the assistance of the PTA of SMKTC.

With the support of the school's PTA, in January 2002, the first classroom on the first floor of Block B was converted into a second computer lab. In May 2003, the audiovisual room was converted into a third computer lab which was fully funded by the Ministry of Education.

Nowadays
Today, the school boasts four blocks of buildings, two air-conditioned cabin classrooms, six science labs, three life skills workshops, three computer labs, a newly renovated canteen, a surau, a staffroom with a working centre, a school field, a basketball court, a volleyball court, a sepak takraw court, a resource centre, a self-access learning room, a multimedia room, a first aid room, a music room, an extended car park, and a large hall.

List of principals

Timeline

See also
 List of schools in Malaysia
 Taman Connaught

External links
 

Educational institutions established in 1989
Secondary schools in Malaysia
Schools in Kuala Lumpur
Educational institutions established in 2002
2002 establishments in Malaysia